Pure Love, released internationally as Unforgettable, is a 2016 South Korean romance drama film starring Doh Kyung-soo and Kim So-hyun.

Plot 
In 2014, a radio DJ gets a letter from his first love that brings up almost-forgotten memories of the past.

23 years ago in 1991, five friends spend the summer together. One of them, shy and innocent Beom-sil falls in love with Soo-ok. Beom-sil has a noticeable crush on Soo-ok and waits by the girl's window during the summer. Soo-ok suffers from a leg injury that renders her unable to walk properly so she is always carried by Beom-sil. The love blossoms and how he always sees her as the girl he had want to marry.

Cast 
 Do Kyung-soo as Beom-sil
 Park Yong-woo as Hyung-joon / adult Beom-sil
 Kim So-hyun as Soo-ok
 Lee David as Gae-duk
 Lee Beom-soo as Yong-chul / adult Gae-duk
 Joo Da-young as Gil-ja
 Kim Ji-ho as adult Gil-ja
 Yeon Joon-seok as San-dol
 Park Hae-joon as Min-ho / adult San-dol
 Lee Dae-yeon as Soo-ok's father
 Park Choong-sun as Bum-shil's father
 Hwang Young-hee as Bum-shil's mother
 Hwang Seok-jeong as Gae-duk's mother
 Park Jung-min as Yong-soo
 Kim Kwon as Young-il
 Kim Hyun as Woman 1
 Yoon Jung-ro as Writer Park

Production
Filming began on 22 June 2015 in Goheung County, South Jeolla Province.

Awards and nominations

References

External links
  
 
 

2010s Korean-language films
South Korean romantic drama films
2010s South Korean films